Sumiko Inaba (born February 6, 1991) is an American mixed martial artist who competes in the Women's Flyweight division of the Bellator MMA. As of February 7, 2023, she is #9 in the Bellator Women's Flyweight Rankings.

Background 
After graduating King Kekaulike High School, Inaba studied nursing before she discovered mixed martial arts while attending boxing classes to get into shape.

She has a daughter, Kiyarah-Lei, who was born around 2009.

Mixed martial arts career

Early career
She went 6-1 as an amateur, including four TKOs and one submission. After the pandemic put her career in the travel industry on hiatus, she put her full-time efforts into training. She decided to go professional in 2020 and landed an endorsement with Hilo-based Waiakea Water Company.

Bellator MMA
After a successful amateur career, Inaba signed with Bellator MMA.

She made her professional MMA debut against Jessica Ruiz on November 5, 2020 at Bellator 251.

In her sophomore performance, Inaba faced Kristina Katsikis on May 21, 2021 at Bellator 259. She won the bout via third round TKO.

Inaba faced Randi Field on October 16, 2021 at Bellator 268. She won the bout via arm-triangle choke in the second round.

Inaba faced Whittany Pyles on April 23, 2022 at  Bellator 279. At the weigh-ins, Pyles missed weight for her bout, weighing in at 127.4 pounds, 1.4 pounds over the flyweight non-title fight limit. The bout proceeded at catchweight and Pyles was fined a percentage of her purse, which went to Inaba. Inaba knocked out her opponent with a left hook in the first round.

Inaba faced Nadine Mandiau on October 1, 2022 at Bellator 286. She won the bout after grinding out an unanimous decision.

Inaba is scheduled to face Veta Arteaga on April 22, 2023 at Bellator 295.

Mixed martial arts record

|-
|Win
|align=center| 5–0
|Nadine Mandiau
|Decision (unanimous)
|Bellator 286
|
|align=center|3
|align=center|5:00
|Long Beach, California, United States
|
|-
| Win
| align=center| 4–0
| Whittany Pyles
| KO (punches)
| Bellator 279
| 
| align=center| 1
| align=center| 1:22
| Honolulu, Hawaii, United States
| 
|-
| Win
| align=center| 3–0
| Randi Field
| Submission (arm-triangle choke)
|Bellator 268 
|
| align=center| 2
| align=center| 2:02
|Phoenix, Arizona, United States 
|
|-
| Win
| align=center| 2–0
| Kristina Katsikis
| TKO (punches)
|Bellator 259 
|
| align=center| 3
| align=center| 3:35
|Uncasville, Connecticut, United States
|
|-
| Win
| align=center| 1–0
| Jessica Ruiz
| TKO (elbows)
|Bellator 251
|
| align=center| 1
| align=center| 4:59
| Uncasville, Connecticut, United States
|

|-
| Win
| align=center| 6–1
| Kelsey Gilmore
| TKO (punches)
| Cowboy Fight Series 2
| 
| align=center| 3
| align=center| 0:57
| Sterling, Virginia, United States
| 
|-
| Win
| align=center| 5–1
| Nadine Mandiau
| TKO (punches)
| Tuff-N-Uff: Fight Night Henderson
| 
| align=center| 1
| align=center| 1:05
| Henderson, Nevada, United States
| 
|-
| Win
| align=center| 4–1
| Tenika Waldroup
| Submission (armbar)
| Tuff-N-Uff: Pack The Mack
| 
| align=center| 2
| align=center| 2:03
| Las Vegas, Nevada, United States
| 
|-
| Win
| align=center| 3–1
| Brianne Jhun
| Decision (unanimous)
| War on the Valley Isle 6
| 
| align=center| 3
| align=center| 3:00
| Wailuku, Hawaii, United States
| 
|-
| Win
| align=center| 2–1
| Des Vida
| TKO (punches)
| War on the Valley Isle 5
| 
| align=center| 2
| align=center| 2:31
| Wailuku, Hawaii, United States
|
|-
| Loss
| align=center| 1–1
| Kendra Elizabeth Linn
| Decision (majority)
| Maui FC 6
| 
| align=center| 3
| align=center| 3:00
| Maui, Hawaii, United States
|
|-
| Win
| align=center| 1–0
| Katherine Antoniak
| TKO (punches)
| War on the Valley Isle 3
| 
| align=center| 2
| align=center| 1:49
| Kahului, Hawaii, United States
|

See also
 List of current Bellator fighters
 List of female mixed martial artists

References

External links 
  
 

1991 births
Living people
American female mixed martial artists
Flyweight mixed martial artists
Mixed martial artists utilizing boxing
Bellator female fighters
American sportspeople of Japanese descent